Rear Admiral Royal Rodney Ingersoll (4 December 1847 – 21 April 1931) was a United States Navy officer whose career extended from the late 1860s through World War I.

Biography
Ingersoll was born in Niles, Michigan on 4 December 1847 and graduated from the United States Naval Academy in 1868. He served in various ships of the fleet on the European and Asiatic Squadrons until 1876 when he was assigned to the Naval Academy.

He taught and wrote about ordnance subjects during several tours at the Academy, and in the early years of the 20th century commanded such ships as Bennington (PG-4), New Orleans (CL-22), and Maryland (ACR-8). He graduated from the Naval War College as a captain in 1903 and as a rear admiral in 1908.

Ingersoll was Chief of Staff of the Atlantic Fleet during the first part of the Great White Fleet's famous cruise around the world, and served in 1908 as a member of the General Board.

Rear Admiral Ingersoll retired in 1909, but was recalled up to duty during World War I as President of the Naval Ordnance Board. In 1919 he returned to his home in La Porte, Indiana, where he was active in public affairs until his death on 21 April 1931 at age 83.

His son, Admiral Royal Eason Ingersoll (1883–1976), commanded the US Atlantic Fleet during World War II.

Namesake
In 1943, the destroyer USS Ingersoll (DD-652) was named in honor of R. Adm. Ingersoll and his grandson, Lieutenant Royal R. Ingersoll II (1913–1942), who had died in the Battle of Midway.

References

1847 births
1931 deaths
People from Niles, Michigan
United States Naval Academy alumni
United States Navy admirals
Naval War College alumni
United States Navy personnel of World War I
Military personnel from Michigan